The 8mm Remington Magnum belted rifle cartridge was introduced by Remington Arms Company in 1978 as a new chambering for the model 700 BDL rifle.  The 8mm Remington Magnum's parent case is the .375 H&H Magnum. It is a very long and powerful cartridge that cannot be used in standard length actions, such as those that accommodate the .30-06 Springfield.

Background
The 8mm Remington Magnum was intended to compete with the .300 Weatherby Magnum and .338 Winchester Magnum. Remington's decision to use a metric bullet may have been prompted by their past success with the 7 mm bore diameter.

Even though the 8mm Remington Magnum has never been very popular, it is a very suitable cartridge for the hunting of elk, moose, caribou, and larger African antelope. However, the .338 Winchester Magnum had a 30-year head start on the market, and is short enough for medium length actions, which increases the models of rifles it could be produced in. It is also available with heavier bullets, although this isn't a problem for people that load their own rounds of this caliber. Bullet selection is quite critical with the 8mm Remington Magnum since the bullets have to be designed and constructed to hold together at magnum velocities.

Cartridge dimensions
The 8mm Remington Magnum has 6.43 ml (99 grain) H2O cartridge case capacity.

8mm Remington Magnum maximum C.I.P. cartridge dimensions. All sizes in millimetres (mm).

Americans would define the shoulder angle at alpha/2 = 25 degrees. The common rifling twist rate for this cartridge is 254 mm (1 in 10 in), 6 grooves, Ø lands = 8.00 mm, Ø grooves = 8.20 mm, land width = 3.10 mm and the primer type is large rifle magnum.

According to the official C.I.P. (Commission Internationale Permanente pour l'Epreuve des Armes à Feu Portatives) guidelines the 8mm Remington Magnum case can handle up to  piezo pressure. In C.I.P. regulated countries every rifle cartridge combo has to be proofed at 125% of this maximum C.I.P. pressure to certify for sale to consumers.

This means that 8mm Remington Magnum chambered arms in C.I.P. regulated countries are currently (2014) proof tested at  PE piezo pressure.

The SAAMI Maximum Average Pressure (MAP) for this cartridge is  piezo pressure.

The German 8×68mm S cartridge introduced in 1939 is probably the closest ballistic twin of the 8mm Remington Magnum. The 8×68mm S is however a rebated rim cartridge.

The 8mm Remington Magnum in field use
The 8mm Remington Magnum as a pure civil cartridge can be used in countries which ban civil use of former or current military ammunition.

A powerful cartridge like the 8mm Remington Magnum has its drawbacks. Like every other big game cartridge it presents a stout recoil. Since there are not many factory loads available, the 8mm Remington Magnum is often used by reloaders. They can use this cartridge to create powerful loads by handloading, while staying within the 448 MPa (65000 psi) SAAMI piezo pressure limit. Combined with bullets with jackets designed for magnum cartridge muzzle velocities, and barrels of 650 mm (25.6 in) or longer to promote high muzzle velocities, the 8mm Remington Magnum offers the flattest trajectory and best long range performance of the commercially available 8 mm rifle cartridges.

From 8 mm caliber upwards the rise of sectional density and penetrating capability of practical spin stabilized rifle bullets (bullets up to 5 to 5.5 calibers in length) tends to flatten out.

This means that loaded with light, short and soft-nosed 8 mm bullets the 8mm Remington Magnum can be used on remarkably small game. Loaded with heavy, long and hard (solid copper) bullets the 8mm Remington Magnum offers enough velocity derived power to penetrate heavy and dangerous game.  With developed handloads, the 8mm Remington Magnum is capable of driving a 220 grain boat tail bullet in excess of 3,000 ft/sec, and delivers as much energy at 500 yards (457m) as the .308 Winchester has at the muzzle.  Lighter bullets of 150-180 grains can be driven to velocities of 3,300-3,500 ft/sec, putting it in the same class as the larger cased .300 Remington Ultra Magnum; Such loads offer a very flat trajectory, making it an optimal choice for deer and elk sized game at very long range.  The 8mm Remington Magnum is suitable for hunting almost any game animal on the planet, though certain sub-Saharan Africa countries have a 9.53 mm (.375 in) or 10.2 mm (.40 in) minimum caliber rule for hunting Big Five game - i.e. leopard, lion, cape buffalo, rhinoceros and African elephant. In the Central African Republic, where there are no ammunition limits for hunting Big Five game, the 8mm Remington Magnum's somewhat smaller sister cartridge the 8×68mm S is used successfully for hunting African elephant. At equal chamber pressure and 650 mm (25.6 in) barrel length the larger 8mm Remington Magnum produces 3 to 5% extra muzzle velocity.

8mm cartridges compared
Maximum muzzle velocity comparison in % of the probably most proliferated European and American 8 mm rifle cartridges out of 650 mm (25.59 in) long barrels loaded with relatively light to heavy 8 mm bullets to their C.I.P. or SAAMI (Sporting Arms and Ammunition Manufacturers’ Institute) sanctioned maximum pressures.

This comparison is not totally objective since the 8mm Remington Magnum and .325 WSM operate at 448.16 MPa (65,000 psi), the 8×68mm S at 440 MPa (63,817 psi), the 8×64mm S at 405 MPa (58740 psi) and the 7.92×57mm Mauser at 390 MPa (56,564 psi) maximum chamber pressure. Higher chamber pressure results in higher muzzle velocities.

The 8mm Remington Magnum as parent case

7mm STW (Shooting Times Westerner)
The 8mm Remington Magnum case has functioned as the parent case for the 7mm STW, which is essentially a 7 mm (.284 caliber) necked-down version of the 8mm Remington Magnum. Designed by Layne Simpson, Editor of Shooting Times magazine, the wildcat status of the 7mm STW ended in 1996 when it got SAAMI certified and became an officially registered and sanctioned member of the 8mm Remington Magnum "family" of magnum rifle cartridges.  With top handloads pushing a 150 grain bullet at nearly 3,400 feet per second, it is one of the fastest mid-bore rifle cartridges extant and is noted for its extremely flat trajectory.  It is outclassed only by the Lazzeroni 7.21 Firebird and Remington's 7mm RUM

.416 Remington Magnum
The 8mm Remington Magnum case also has functioned as the parent case for the .416 Remington Magnum, which is  a .416" caliber necked up version of the 8mm Remington Magnum. Unlike the 7 mm STW, the .416 Remington Magnum never had a wildcat status. It was designed by Remington and released directly to the public in 1988.

Wildcats
Cartridges that are not officially registered with nor sanctioned by C.I.P. (Commission Internationale Permanente pour l'Epreuve des Armes à Feu Portatives) or its American equivalent, SAAMI (Sporting Arms and Ammunition Manufacturers’ Institute) are generally known as wildcats. By blowing out standard factory cases the wildcatter generally hopes to gain extra muzzle velocity by increasing the case capacity of the factory parent cartridge case by a few percent. Practically there can be some muzzle velocity gained by this method, but the measured results between parent cartridges and their 'improved' wildcat offspring is often marginal. Besides changing the shape and internal volume of the parent cartridge case, wildcatters also can change the original caliber. A reason to change the original caliber can be to comply with a minimal permitted caliber or bullet weight for the legal hunting of certain species of game.

Wildcats are not governed by C.I.P. or SAAMI rules so wildcatters can capitalize the achievable high operating pressures. Because the 8mm Remington Magnum offers an exceptional sturdy, pressure resistant cartridge case that can relatively easily be reloaded with primers, powder and bullets and hence be reused several times it has become quite popular amongst wildcatters. With the 8mm Remington Magnum as the parent case wildcatters have created 6.35 mm (0.257 in) (.257 STW), 6.5 mm (0.264 in) (6.5 mm STW), .30 caliber (.30–8mm Remington Magnum, .300 Jarrett), 8 mm caliber (8 mm Jarrett), .338 caliber (.338 Jarrett), 0.358 in caliber (.358 STA) and 9.53 mm (0.375 in) (.375 JRS [John R. Sundra]) variants.

.358 STA (Shooting Times Alaskan)
Another brainchild of Layne Simpson, the .358 STA is an 8mm Remington Magnum case necked up to accept .358 Caliber bullets with the shoulder angle changed from 25 degrees to 35 degrees and body taper removed to maximize powder capacity. Able to propel a 300 grain bullet at over 2700 feet per second for 4,900 ft.-lbs. of energy, the .358 STA is a formidable big game cartridge.  It has never emerged as a production cartridge and has had very limited success as a wildcat, overshadowed by the more popular .375 caliber commercial and custom cartridges.

See also
 8 mm caliber
 Handloading
 List of rifle cartridges
 Table of handgun and rifle cartridges

References

External links
SAAMI Maximum cartridge/Minimum chamber 8mm Remington Magnum

Pistol and rifle cartridges
Remington Magnum rifle cartridges